Sainte-Marcelline-de-Kildare is a municipality in the Lanaudière region of Quebec, Canada, part of the Matawinie Regional County Municipality.

Etymology
The name Sainte-Marcelline-de-Kildare honors Saint Marcellina, a catholic saint who lived in the 4th century. She was chosen because she was the elder sister of Ambrose, another saint which the neighboring municipality of Saint-Ambroise-de-Kildare was named after. Since the municipality of Sainte-Marcelline-de-Kildare was created from territories of Saint=Ambroise-de-Kildare, it made sense to name the municipality after her. The name Kildare honors the town of Kildare in Ireland, a town from which most of the first settlers of the municipality came from.

Demographics

Population

Private dwellings occupied by usual residents: 829 (total dwellings: 1019)

Language
Mother tongue:
 English as first language: 2.2%
 French as first language: 95.3%
 English and French as first language: 1.4%
 Other as first language: 1.1%

Education

Commission scolaire des Samares operates Francophone public schools:
 École de Sainte-Marcelline

Sir Wilfrid Laurier School Board operates Anglophone public schools:
 Rawdon Elementary School in Rawdon
 Joliette High School in Joliette

See also
List of municipalities in Quebec

References

Incorporated places in Lanaudière
Municipalities in Quebec
Matawinie Regional County Municipality